Fatal Fury Special, known as  in Japan, is a 1993 fighting game developed and published by SNK and originally released for the Neo Geo arcade and home platforms. It is an updated version of 1992's Fatal Fury 2, introducing several changes to the gameplay system while expanding the available character roster.

Gameplay 

Fatal Fury Special is an updated version of Fatal Fury 2. It features many of the same graphics and gameplay, although some slight changes were made to the system, including faster game speed and an all new combo system. Unlike the previous Fatal Fury games, Special allows the player to combine their attacks. When an attack lands, the player will have a brief moment of invincibility. The number of Line Move Attacks have also increased; pressing the Light Punch or Light Kick button while the opponent is on an opposite line will perform a Low Line Jump Attack.

The single-player mode has the player fighting all of the playable characters, beginning with the eight regular characters from the previous game, as well as Tung and Duck, with the player given a choice in their first opponent. After the first ten opponents, the player will fight against Billy, Axel, Laurence, Geese, and Krauser, in that order. If the player wins every match in two rounds, then the player will be challenged by Ryo in a special "Dream Match".

Characters
The character roster of Fatal Fury 2 returns. The four AI-only characters from the previous game (Billy Kane, Axel Hawk, Laurence Blood, and Wolfgang Krauser) can now be controlled by the player, and three characters from the original Fatal Fury (Tung Fu Rue, Duck King, and Geese Howard) return, increasing the number of playable characters to fifteen. Ryo Sakazaki, the protagonist of Art of Fighting, appears as a hidden opponent at the end of the Single Player Mode and is playable in the home versions. This cross-over inspired SNK to create The King of Fighters series, the first installment of which, The King of Fighters '94, was released a year after Fatal Fury Special.

Release

Home versions
In addition to the home versions for the Neo Geo and Neo Geo CD, conversions of Fatal Fury Special were made for the Super Nintendo Entertainment System, Sega CD and Game Gear, as well as the PC Engine game console (in Arcade CD-ROM² format), and the X68000 and FM Towns computer platforms in Japan between 1994 and 1996. The game is included in 2007's Fatal Fury: Battle Archives Volume 1 for the PlayStation 2.

Fatal Fury Special for the Neo Geo was later released on the Virtual Console in 2010. An emulation of the Neo Geo arcade game was also released for the Xbox Live Arcade in 2007. Furthermore, mobile versions were released for Android and iOS based devices. It was later ported to Nintendo Switch in July 2017 by a Japanese game publisher HAMSTER.

Reception

In Japan, Game Machine listed Fatal Fury Special on their October 15, 1993 issue as being the most-successful table arcade unit of the month. It went on to be Japan's third highest-grossing arcade game of 1994, just below Super Street Fighter II X and Virtua Fighter. In North America, RePlay reported that Fatal Fury Special was the seventh most-popular arcade game in December 1993. Play Meter also listed Fatal Fury Special to be the thirty-eighth most-popular arcade game at the time.

The Neo Geo version received positive reviews from critics. GamePro praised the variety of characters, the addition of new moves for the older characters, the combos, the detailed graphics, and the humorous touches to the backgrounds, though they felt the ability to jump between the foreground and background tended to be an annoyance. All four reviewers for Electronic Gaming Monthly (EGM) referred to it as "one of the best tournament fighting games out there" (with insignificant changes in wording between each reviewer). They praised the new characters, the improved backgrounds and animations.

GamePro gave the Game Gear version a rave review, stating that though it has fewer characters and vastly inferior graphics and sounds compared to the Neo Geo version, it "is arguably the best handheld fighting game ever released" due to the responsive action and the inclusion of "extra elements you never thought you'd see in a handheld fighter". The magazine particularly applauded the presence of a combo system and the numerous special moves.

GamePro declared the Sega CD version "yet another Neo Geo arcade game that's been poorly converted for a home system". Although they complimented the inclusion of all the characters, moves, and music of the arcade version, they felt that the removal of key animation frames and distinctive background elements would make the conversion a major disappointment to anyone used to the arcade game. The four reviewers of Electronic Gaming Monthly instead judged it to be an overall solid conversion, remarking that the sound effects are weak and garbled, but the music, play controls, and graphics all replicate the original with reasonable accuracy.

All four reviewers of EGM complained of the severe echo effect in the audio of the SNES version, and two of them said that some of the moves are hard to pull off. However, they commented that the graphics, while a step down from the Neo Geo version, are still relatively sharp, and judged it an overall good conversion. GamePro was less pleased with the conversion, and remarked that the graphics and controls are vastly inferior to those of the Neo Geo version. They also criticized the special moves which are activated when a character is near death as a "cheesy way of evening things out between players of varying skill levels." Next Generation also gave it a negative review, though almost solely for its perceived lack of originality, commenting that "sprite-based 2D fighting games are a dime a dozen, and in spite of the impressive Dolby Surround, all this one really has going it is sheer size: 15 characters ... and five special moves apiece, some of which are slick, but none of which you haven't pulled off it some other game of its ilk."

Jeff Gerstmann of GameSpot, reviewing the Xbox Live Arcade release, remarked that the game is emulated well, and approved of the fact that it emulates the Neo Geo home version rather than the arcade version. He stated that the game itself is good compared to other Neo Geo fighters of its time, but would probably not appeal to modern players who are not already familiar with the Fatal Fury franchise. In a 1996 retrospective review, Maximum commented that Fatal Fury Special "tweaked the gameplay of Fatal Fury 2 overly very superficially, and the main selling point lay with the number of combatants". However, they praised the more hectic pace of the game, and gave it 3 out of 5 stars.

References

Bibliography
All About Garou Densetsu Special (ALL ABOUT 餓狼伝説スペシャル) (All About Series Vol. 3), a guide book from Dempa Shimbunsha;
Garou Densetsu Special (餓狼伝説スペシャル) (Gamest Extra No.106), a magazine-book from Shinseisha;
Garou Densetsu Special 4-Koma Ketteiban (餓狼伝説スペシャル 4コマ決定版) (Gamest Comics 6), a 4-koma manga from Shinseisha;
Garou Densetsu Special Cancellation (餓狼伝説スペシャル キャンセレーション), a book from Hakosho;
Garou Densetsu Special Hisshō Kōryaku Hō (餓狼伝説スペシャル 必勝攻略法) (NEO-GEO Kanpeki Koryaku Series 1), a guide book from Futabasha;
Garou Densetsu Special Hisshō Kōryaku Hon (餓狼伝説スペシャル 必勝攻略本) (Haoh Game Special 13), a guide book from Kodansha;
Garou Densetsu Special Kanzen Kōryaku Hon (餓狼伝説スペシャル 完全攻略本), a SFC guide book from Tokuma Shoten;
Garou Densetsu Special Super Guide (餓狼伝説スペシャル スーパーガイド), a SNES guide book from Kodansha.

Discography
Garou Densetsu Special (餓狼伝説スペシャル) (PCCB-00138), an original soundtrack by SNK Neo Sound Orchestra from Pony Canyon;
Garou Densetsu Special Image Album Part 1 (餓狼伝説スペシャル イメージアルバム パート1) (PCCB-00152) and Garou Densetsu Special Image Album Part 2 (PCCB-00155), a two-part arranged soundtrack from Pony Canyon.

Filmography 
Garou Densetsu Special - Chōzetsu Butō Kai (餓狼伝説スペシャル 超絶武闘会) official VHS tape (PCVP-11355) and Laser Disc (PCLP-00494) from Pony Canyon.

External links 
 Fatal Fury Special at GameFAQs
 Fatal Fury Special at Giant Bomb
 Fatal Fury Special at Killer List of Videogames
 Fatal Fury Special at MobyGames

1993 video games
ACA Neo Geo games
Android (operating system) games
Arcade video games
Aspect Co. games
D4 Enterprise games
Fatal Fury
Fighting games
FM Towns games
Funcom games
IOS games
Magical Company games
Multiplayer and single-player video games
Neo Geo games
Neo Geo CD games
Nintendo Switch games
PlayStation Network games
PlayStation 4 games
Sega CD games
Game Gear games
X68000 games
SNK games
SNK Playmore games
Super Nintendo Entertainment System games
Takara video games
TurboGrafx-CD games
Video games set in the United States
Video games set in Thailand
Video games set in Italy
Video games set in Japan
Video games set in China
Video games set in South Korea
Video games set in Hong Kong
Video games set in Australia
Video games set in England
Video games set in Spain
Video games set in Germany
Virtual Console games
Xbox 360 Live Arcade games
Xbox One games
Video games developed in Japan
Hamster Corporation games